Joseph McDowell is the name of:

Joseph "Pleasant Gardens" McDowell (1758–1799), American Revolutionary War soldier and legislator from North Carolina
Joseph McDowell Jr. (1756–1801), "Quaker Meadows Joe", American Revolutionary War soldier and legislator from North Carolina
Joseph J. McDowell (1800–1877), U.S. Representative from Ohio, son of Joseph "Quaker Meadows" McDowell
Joseph Nash McDowell (1804–1868), American doctor